Leninskyi District is an urban district of Donetsk, Ukraine, named after a Soviet political figure Vladimir Lenin.

It was created in 1937 as the Factory-Stalin Raion.

Places

External links
 Lenin Raion at the Uzovka website
 Lenin Raion at the Mayor of Donetsk website

Urban districts of Donetsk